Giuseppe Ercolani (13 October 1901 – 19 March 1985) was an Italian racing cyclist. He rode in the 1923 Tour de France.

References

1901 births
1985 deaths
Italian male cyclists
Place of birth missing